Claude "Cupe" Perry (October 31, 1901 – July 17, 1975) was a professional American football player who played offensive tackle for nine seasons for the Green Bay Packers. He was born in Goodsprings, Alabama. Perry played collegiate football for Wallace Wade's Alabama Crimson Tide football teams of the University of Alabama. In 1926 his team was a national champion and "Cupe" Perry was selected All-Southern.

References

1901 births
1975 deaths
American football offensive tackles
Alabama Crimson Tide football players
Green Bay Packers players
People from Walker County, Alabama
Players of American football from Alabama
All-Southern college football players